MVP 07: NCAA Baseball is a video game for the PlayStation 2 that was released February 6, 2007.  Former Long Beach State pitcher and 2004 Roger Clemens Award winner Jered Weaver is on the cover, wearing his 2004 college uniform. This is also the last game in the series.

Reception 
The game was met with positive reception upon release, as GameRankings gave it a score of 76.89%, while Metacritic gave it 76 out of 100.

See also
MVP Baseball
MVP 06: NCAA Baseball

References

Video games developed in Canada
PlayStation 2 games
PlayStation 2-only games
College baseball video games in the United States
2007 video games
Cancelled Xbox games
Cancelled GameCube games
EA Sports games
NCAA video games